The 8th Division (abbreviation for ) is a division of the Xinjiang Production and Construction Corps (XPCC) distributed over Shihezi and Karamay cities, Manas and Shawan counties, Xinjiang Uygur Autonomous Region, China. It is an economic and paramilitary unit formed in 1953 from the former 26th Infantry Division of the 9th Army of the 22rd Corps of the PLA. The 8th Agricultural Construction Division (abbreviation for ) was approved and renamed to the present 8th Division of the XPCC in 2012. The division is composed of 14 regiments, and headquartered in Shihezi City, it merges work in one official with Shihezi City. The Shihezi Reclamation Area of the 8th Division has an area of 5,851 square kilometers with a total population of 696,900 and a permanent population of 661,300 (as of 2018), of that, the Shihezi City has an area of 460 square kilometers with a total population of 448,100 and a permanent population of 437,900 (as of 2018). In the year of 2018, GDP of the 8th Division was CN￥54.85 billion (US$8.29 billion), and the GDP per capita CN￥82,584 (US$12,480).

Since the establishment of Shihezi City in April 1975, the 8th Division and the city have practised management model of unity of the division and Shihezi City. The Shihezi Agriculture, Industry and Commerce Joint Enterprise Group Corporation was formed in the reclamation area of the former 8th division in February 1979, the group corporation is co-located with Shihezi City and is integrated into administrative and business enterprises. In December 1981, the XPCC was restored, and its 8th Agriculture and Production Division (renamed as the 8th Division of XPCC in 2012 ) was resumed at the same time, from then onwards the 8th Division has enjoyed the same institution and two brands, and continued to work with Shihezi City.

History

On December 20, 1949, the former Kuomintang 78th Division, 227th Brigade, Cavalry Regiment of 178th Brigade, 194th Regiment of 65th Brigade, Munition Battalion of 42nd Division were incorporated as the 26th Infantry Division of the 9th Army of the 22nd Corps of the PLA. Its leaders were the division chief Luo Ruzheng, political commissar Wang Jilong, 1st deputy division chief Gao Rongguang, 2nd deputy division chief Zhou Mao, chief of staff Xiong Lüe, director of the political department Yu Zhengdong. The division was headquartered in the county seat of Jinghua County (present Hutubi County). It had the 76th Regiment, the 77th Regiment, the 78th Regiment, and a munition battalion.

26th Infantry Division
In March 1950, the 26th Infantry Division relocated its headquarters from Jinghua County to Suilai County (the present Manas County). In March 1953, the troops of Xinjiang Military Region (XMR) were reorganized, and the 26th Division was integrated into the XMR. It was renamed to the 8th Agricultural Construction Division of the XMR. The three regiments under its jurisdiction were renamed as the 22nd, 23rd and 24 Regiment of the agricultural construction division. On May 27, the 8th Agricultural Construction Division was ordered by the Central Military Commission (CMC) and changed to be a production force as a whole to produce on its place. In August 1953, the 8th Agricultural Construction Division moved its headquarters from Manas County to Shihezi.

8th Agricultural Construction Division
On August 6, 1954, the CMC General Staff issued a decree to revoke the XMR Production Management Department and the 22nd Corps, and establish the XMR Production and Construction Corps (XPCC). On October 7 of the same year, the XMR issued an order to announce the organization of the XMR Production and Construction Corps and the designation of its competent forces. The 8th Agricultural Construction Division officially belonged to the leadership of the XMR Production and Construction Corps on November 1, 1954. In February 1955, the 10th Agricultural Construction Division was abolished, and the 30th regiment and labor reform detachment of the 10th division were merged into the 8th Agricultural Construction Division. From May 21 to 26, 1956, the first CPC Congress of the 8th Agricultural Construction Division was held. Elected the first committee of 15 people, Yu Zhengdong was the CPC secretary, and Liu Bingzhen was the CPC deputy secretary.

On August 29, 1967, the temporary Cultural Revolution Committee of the 8th Agricultural Construction Division was established. On October 4, Gong Jianzhang was appointed as the director. On December 2, 1968, the 8th Agricultural Construction Division established a temporary CPC committee with five members of the standing committee, Duan Yifeng as the secretary, and Xiao Fengrui as the deputy secretary. In August of the same year, the division held the Cultural Revolutionary Activist Conference, and elected the Cultural Revolutionary Committee of the division, with 61 members, 23 members of the Standing Committee, Director Duan Yifeng, and 2nd Director Xiao Fengrui.

On July 7, 1969, the XPCC made a decision to change the new military designation of army units in the corps: the former 7th Anjihai Farm of the 8th Agricultural Construction Division was changed as 141th Regiment, the 22nd Regiment Farm as the 142nd Regiment, the 23rd Regiment Farm as the 143rd Regiment, Shihezi headquarters Farm as the 145th Regiment and 146th Regiment, the 30th Regiment Farm as the 147th Regiment, the 2nd Mosuowan Farm as the 148th Regiment, the 5th Mosuowan Farm as the 149th Regiment, Gongqingtuan Farm as the 150th Regiment, Ziniquan breedingsheep Farm as the 151th Regiment. At the end of the year, 144th Regiment was formed.

On June 1–4, 1971, the 8th Agricultural Construction Division held the 2nd CPC Congress, and elected 43 members of its 2nd committee. The committee elected 12 members of the Standing Committee, and Duan Yifeng served as Secretary and Zhang Shengke as Deputy secretary. On April 20, 1975, the CPC Central Committee approved "Request for Strengthening the CPC's Unified Leadership and Changing the XPCC", and agreed to revoke the XPCC and its affiliated organizations. According to the arrangement, the 8th Agricultural Construction Division was cancelled.

Present
On December 3, 1981, the CPC Central Committee, the State Council and the Central Military Commission decided to resume the Xinjiang Production and Construction Corps system and be under the dual leadership of Xinjiang Uygur Autonomous Region and the Ministry of Agriculture and Land Reclamation. The 8th Agricultural Construction Division was resumed and the use of the military designation began on May 25, 1982. the 8th Agricultural Construction Division of the XPCC (abbreviation for ) was approved to rename as the present 8th Division of Xinjiang Production and Construction Corps  by the State Commission Office for Public Sector Reform on October 25, 2012.

Regiments

Geography
The Shihezi Reclamation Area of the 8th Division is located in the northern foothills of Tianshan, the southern margin of the Junggar Basin, the east longitude is 84°58′- 86°24′, and the north latitude is 43°26′- 45°20. Its agricultural and pastoral regiment farms, and factories and mines in a number of groups, are kept in Shihezi, Karamay cities and Shawan, Manas counties. The northeast is connected with Lanzhouwan Township and the Xinghu Headquarters Farm Of the 6th Division in Manas County, the southern part is directly connected to Hejing County in the mountainous region in Shawan County, the west is adjacent to the city of Kuytun in the western part of Shawan County, the north-west is deep into the city of Karamay, and the north is bordered by the Gurbantünggüt Desert.

Economy
According to preliminary accounting, in the year of 2018, the gross domestic product of Shihezi Reclamation Area reached CN￥54,851 million (US$8,289 million), an increase of 4.6% over the previous year. The value added of the primary industry was CN￥8,955 million (US$1,353 million), an increase of 7.8%, the value added of the secondary industry decreased by 5.6% to CN￥19,764 million (US$2,987 million), and the value added of the tertiary industry was CN￥25,059 million (US$3,787 million), an increase of 12.8%. The　GDP　per capita is CN￥82,584 (US$12,480). At the end of the year, 330,400 people were employed in the reclamation area.

Agriculture

As of 2018, the total output value of agriculture, forestry, animal husbandry and fishery was CN￥20,744 million (US$3,135 million), an increase of 6.1% over the previous year. The annual crop planting area was 286.7 thou hectares, among them, the grain sown area is 13.57 thou hectares, and the cotton planting area is 25.21 thou hectares. The annual total grain output was 122 thou tons, the total cotton output was 610.6 thou tons, the vegetables were 449.1 thou tons, the fruit output was 253.4 thou tons, and the industrial tomato sauce was 127.2 thou tons. The annual total meat output was 90.1 thou tons, the milk output was 268.7 thou tons, and the eggs were 17.6 thou tons. At the end of the year, there were 860.2 thou heads of livestock, including 105.6 thou heads of cattle, 522.6 thou heads of pigs and 232.2 thou sheep. The number of livestock on hand was 1.129 million heads, including 47.2 thou heads of cattle, 908.1 thou heads of pigs and 171.2 thou sheep. The annual output of aquatic products was 9,500 tons.

Manufacturing industry
In the manufacturing sector, the 8th Division is based on cotton yarns, chemicals, cement, electrolytic aluminum, raw coal mining, food and beverages, and food materials as the pillar industries. In year of 2018, the 8th Division produced 133.16 thou tons of cotton yarn, 2.16 million tons of calcium carbide, 1.30 million tons of PVC, 0.89 million tons of caustic soda, 0.18 million tons of hydrochloric acid, 54.64 thou tons of plastic products, 2.59 million tons of cement, and electrolytic aluminum 1.17 million tons, raw coal 0.23 million tons, dairy products 60.74 thou tons, tomato sauce 49.76 thou tons, instant noodles 23.19 thou tons, refined edible vegetable oil 53.87 thou tons, wheat flour 41.54 thou tons.

Economic and Technological Development Zone
The Shihezi Economic and Technological Development Zone is located in the eastern suburbs of Shihezi City. It was established in December 1992 with the approval of the Xinjiang Government and was upgraded to a national economic and technological development zone with the approval of the State Council on April 24, 2000. On March 14, 2014, the Ministry of Science and Technology was recognized as the "A-Class National New Materials High-tech Industrialization Base."  In 2018, the development zone achieved a GDP of CN￥21.52 billion (US$3.25 billion), up 6.5% YoY, of which the value added of the secondary industry was CN￥15,580 million (US$2,354 million), up 8.2% YoY, and the value added of the tertiary industry was CN￥5,940 million (US$898 million), up 2.4% YoY. The fixed assets investment was CN￥5,290 million (US$799 million), down 51.1% YoY. 55 new projects were signed, CN￥27,420 million (US$4,144 million) was invested, its tax was about CN￥6 billion (US$907 million),  and 470 new registered enterprises were added, reaching a total of 3,180 in 2018.

References 

Xinjiang Production and Construction Corps
Ili Kazakh Autonomous Prefecture
1953 establishments in China